Euphaedra villiersi, or Villiers' Ceres forester, is a butterfly in the family Nymphalidae. It is found in Senegal, Guinea-Bissau, Guinea and Sierra Leone. The habitat consists of forests.

References

Butterflies described in 1964
villiersi